The following is a list of monarchs during the history of Bavaria. Bavaria was ruled by several dukes and kings, partitioned and reunited, under several dynasties. Since 1949, Bavaria has been a democratic state in the Federal Republic of Germany.

Monarchs of Bavaria

Ducal Bavaria (also known as the "Old Stem duchy")

Agilolfing dynasty
Around 548 the kings of the Franks placed the border region of Bavaria under the administration of a duke—possibly Frankish or possibly chosen from amongst the local leading families—who was supposed to act as a regional governor for the Frankish king. The first duke we know of, and likely the first, was Gariwald, or Garibald I, a member of the powerful Agilolfing family. This was the beginning of a series of Agilolfing dukes that was to last until 788.

Carolingian dynasty and dominion from the Holy Roman Empire
The kings (later emperors) of the Franks now assumed complete control, placing Bavaria under the rule of non-hereditary governors and civil servants. They were not dukes but rather kings of Bavaria. Emperor Louis the Pious divided control of the Empire among his sons, and the divisions became permanent in the decades following his death in 840. The Frankish rulers controlled Bavaria as part of their possessions.

Ducal Bavaria (also known as the "Younger Stem duchy")
Ruled by an array of dukes from an array of rivaling houses, individually appointed to office.

Luitpolding dynasty, 911–947

Luitpold, founder of the Luitpolding dynasty, was not a duke of Bavaria but a margrave of Carinthia under the rule of Louis the Child. Frankish power had waned in the region due to Hungarian attacks, allowing the local rulers greater independence. Luitpold's son, Arnulf, claimed the title of duke (implying full autonomy) in 911 and was recognized as such by King Henry the Fowler of Germany in 920.

German kings, 947–1070
 
From 947 until the 11th century, the kings of Germany repeatedly transferred Bavaria into different hands (including their own), never allowing any one family to establish itself. Bavaria was ruled by a series of short-lasting, mostly unrelated dynasties.

Houses of Welf and Babenberg, 1070–1180

In 1070, Emperor Henry IV deposed Duke Otto, granting the duchy instead to Welf I, a member of the Italo-Bavarian family of Este. Welf I subsequently quarreled with King Henry and was deprived of his duchy for nineteen years, during which it was directly administered by the German crown. Welf I recovered the duchy in 1096, and was succeeded by his sons Welf II and Henry IX—the latter was succeeded by his son Henry X, who also became Duke of Saxony.

Ducal and Electoral Bavaria (Hereditary dukes)

In 1180, Henry XII the Lion and Frederick I, Holy Roman Emperor, fell out. The emperor consequently dispossessed the duke and gave his territory to Otto I Wittelsbach, Duke of Bavaria of the House of Wittelsbach. From now on, Bavaria remained in the possession of various branches of the family for 738 years until the end of the First World War.

First partition, 1253–1340
In 1253, on Otto II's death, Bavaria was divided between his sons. Henry became Duke of Lower Bavaria and Louis of Upper Bavaria. From this point until the beginning of the 16th century, the territories were frequently divided between brothers, making the Dukes difficult to list.

In Lower Bavaria, Henry XIII was succeeded by his three sons, Otto III, Louis III, and Stephen I ruling jointly. Otto III's successor in the joint dukedom was his son Henry XV. Stephen's successors were his sons Otto IV and Henry XIV. Henry XIV's son was John I.

In Upper Bavaria, Louis II was succeeded by his sons Rudolf I and Louis IV. The latter was elected King of Germany in 1314. After John I's death in 1340, Louis IV unified the Bavarian duchy.

The dukes of Upper Bavaria served also as Counts Palatinate of the Rhine. In 1329 Louis IV released the Palatinate of the Rhine including the Bavarian Upper Palatinate to the sons of Rudolf I. The Upper Palatinate would be reunited with Bavaria in 1623, the Lower Palatinate in 1777.

Second partition 1349–1503
From 1349 until 1503 the second partition of Bavaria took place. In 1349, the six sons of Louis IV partitioned Bavaria into Upper and Lower Bavaria again. In 1353, Lower Bavaria was partitioned into Bavaria-Landshut and Bavaria-Straubing. Upper Bavaria was partitioned between Bavaria-Straubing and Bavaria-Landshut in 1363. After the death of Stephan II in 1392, Bavaria-Landshut was broken into three duchies, John II gained Bavaria-Munich, Frederick, Duke of Bavaria-Landshut received a smaller Bavaria-Landshut, and in Bavaria-Ingolstadt ruled Stephen III, Duke of Bavaria.

Following the Landshut War (1503–1505), the Duke of Bavaria-Munich Albert IV the Wise became ruler of Bavaria. In 1506 Albert decreed that the duchy should pass according to the rules of primogeniture.

In 1623 Maximilian I was granted the title Prince-elector (German: Kurfürst) of the Rhenish Palatinate.

House of Wittelsbach

Partitions of Bavaria under Wittelsbach rule

Table of rulers
(Note: Here the numbering of the dukes is the same for all duchies, as all were titled Dukes of Bavaria, despite of the different parts of land and its particular numbering of the rulers. The dukes are numbered by the year of their succession.)

Kingdom of Bavaria

In 1805 under the Peace of Pressburg between the Napoleonic France and the Holy Roman Empire several duchies were elevated to kingdoms. The Wittelsbach rulers of Bavaria held the title King of Bavaria from 1806 until 1918. The prince-elector of Bavaria, Maximilian IV Joseph formally assumed the title King Maximilian I of Bavaria on 1 January 1806. The well-known so called Märchenkönig (Fairy tale king) Ludwig II constructed Neuschwanstein Castle, Herrenchiemsee, and Linderhof Palace during his reign (1864–1886), threatening not only to go bankrupt in person, but also to bankrupt the country in the process. In 1918 Ludwig III lost his throne in the German Revolution of 1918–1919.

Post-monarchy 

In 1918, at the end of the First World War in the German Revolution of 1918–1919, Bavaria became a democratic republic within the Weimar Republic; the name for the period of Germany from 1919 to 1933. Since then, the heads of government of Bavaria have been ministers-president.

Family tree
Note that Dukes called Louis are usually numbered from Louis the Kelheimer (r. 1189–1231), although four Dukes of Bavaria had been called Louis before that. The same applies to Dukes called Otto, who are sometimes renumbered starting with Otto III, the first Wittelsbach Duke of Bavaria. The highest number has been used in this chart to minimise confusion, with one exception: Ludwig is the German for Louis, but Kings Ludwig I, II and III are not numbered XV, XVI and XVII.

|

References

External links
 
 

 
Rulers
Bavaria
Bavaria
Bavaria, Rulers
Bavaria
Bavaria, Rulers